Funny Yockana Creek is a stream in the U.S. state of Mississippi.

Funny Yockana is a name derived from the Choctaw language meaning "squirrel country".

References

Rivers of Mississippi
Rivers of Neshoba County, Mississippi
Mississippi placenames of Native American origin